Vellai Roja is a 1983 Indian Tamil-language thriller drama film, directed by A. Jagannathan and written and A. L. Narayanan. The film stars Sivaji Ganesan, Ambika, Prabhu and Radha. It is a remake of the Malayalam film Post Mortem. Vellai Roja was released on 4 November 1983, and ran for 100 days in 13 centres.

Plot 

Father James is a Catholic priest, well-respected by the entire town. Parisutham is a multimillionaire and head of the town, Peter who is the son of coffin maker Savaerimuthu is an angry young man, who always fights for justice and is against rich people. Peter's sister Mary and Parisutham's son Johnny are in love. Mary becomes pregnant and at that time Johnny has to leave the country for few days on business, so she asks James' help to arrange her marriage with Johnny because both Parisutham and Peter respect his words. But Peter's girlfriend Lakshmi overhears part of a conversation between James and Mary on her pregnancy and misunderstands that James and Mary were involved in a taboo relationship, and she tells Peter. 

The next day, Mary is found hanging dead from a tree. Peter, in a fit of rage assaults James and gets arrested, but he escapes. Everyone thinks that Mary has committed suicide and she is buried without a postmortem. But James has a suspicion about Mary's death, so he asks his twin brother Arul, Superintendent of Police, to have the body exhumed to perform a postmortem. The next day when Arul exhumes Mary's coffin he finds James murdered and his dead body in it, with Mary's corpse missing. Everyone suspects Peter was the culprit, Arul immediately begins an investigation to solve the mystery behind Mary's missing dead body and James' death. Who is the culprit for James' murder, the motive, was Mary killed or did she commit suicide, why was her body missing and where is Johnny, forms the rest of the story.

Cast 

Sivaji Ganesan as Father James and S. P. Arul
Ambika as Lakshmi
Prabhu as Peter Savari Muthu
Radha as Mary Savari Muthu
Suresh as Johnny
Y. G. Mahendra as Constable Perumal Naidu
Calcutta Viswanathan as Parisutham
Sivachandran as Chinna Durai
Thengai Srinivasan as Rahvuthoor
Pandari Bai as Peter and Mary's Mother
Silk Smitha (Guest Appearance)
Manorama as Arpudhamani Rosappoo
 Indra as Mumtaz
 Vani as Kamakshi
 G. Srinivasan as Savari Muthu
 V. Gopalakrishnan as Police Inspector
Oru Viral Krishna Rao as Dhairiyam

Soundtrack 
The music was composed by Ilaiyaraaja.

Reception 
Jayamanmadhan of Kalki appreciated Ganesan for his performance in two distinctive roles.

References

External links 
 

1980s Tamil-language films
1980s thriller drama films
1983 films
Films about twin brothers
Films directed by A. Jagannathan
Films scored by Ilaiyaraaja
Indian thriller drama films
Tamil remakes of Malayalam films
Twins in Indian films